Heidi Elin Støre (born 4 July 1963) is a Norwegian former footballer who played as a midfielder. As captain for the Norway national team, she won the 1995 FIFA Women's World Cup.

Career
Støre was born in Sarpsborg. She played for the clubs Sprint-Jeløy (Norway), Trollhättan (Sweden), Kolbotn (Norway), Nikko (Japan) and Athene Moss (Norway). She made her debut for the Norway national team in 1980, and played 151 matches for the national team.

She was world champion with the Norwegian team in 1995, received a silver medal in 1991, and won the unofficial world championship tournament in 1988. She was European champion from 1987 and 1993, and received silver medals in 1989 and 1991. She won an Olympic bronze medal with the Norwegian team in 1996.

Støre ended her active career in 1997, but returned as administrator of women's football in 2005. She was appointed leader of the department Toppfotball kvinner of the Football Association of Norway from 2013.

Honours
Norway
 FIFA Women's World Cup: 1995; runner-up 1991

Individual
 Kniksen Award: 1993 with Norway

References

External links

1963 births
Living people
People from Sarpsborg
Sportspeople from Viken (county)
Norwegian women's footballers
Women's association football midfielders
Norway women's international footballers
1991 FIFA Women's World Cup players
1995 FIFA Women's World Cup players
Footballers at the 1996 Summer Olympics
FIFA Women's World Cup-winning players
UEFA Women's Championship-winning players
FIFA Women's World Cup-winning captains
Olympic medalists in football
Medalists at the 1996 Summer Olympics
Olympic footballers of Norway
Olympic bronze medalists for Norway
Toppserien players
Athene Moss players
Nadeshiko League players
SK Sprint-Jeløy (women) players
Kolbotn Fotball players
Nikko Securities Dream Ladies players
FIFA Century Club
Norwegian expatriate women's footballers
Norwegian expatriate sportspeople in Sweden
Expatriate footballers in Sweden
Norwegian expatriate sportspeople in Japan
Expatriate women's footballers in Japan